Corydoras undulatus is a tropical freshwater fish belonging to the Corydoradinae sub-family of the family Callichthyidae.  It originates in inland waters in South America, and is found in the lower Paraná River basin and coastal rivers in southern Brazil and Argentina.

The fish will grow in length up to 1.7 inches (4.4 centimeters).  It lives in a tropical climate in water with a 6.0–8.0 pH, a water hardness of 2–25 dGH, and a temperature range of 72–79 °F (22–26 °C). This information however is unverified by international Catfish research groups who have not been able to confirm these parameters - 

It feeds on worms, benthic crustaceans, insects, and plant matter.  It lays eggs in dense vegetation and adults do not guard the eggs.

See also
List of freshwater aquarium fish species

References

 

Corydoras
Fish described in 1912